Alain Levoyer (20 September 1940 – 10 March 2017) was a French property lawyer and politician. He served as a member of the National Assembly from 1993 to 1997, where he represented Maine-et-Loire. He was also the mayor of Champtoceaux from 1977 to 2001.

References

1940 births
2017 deaths
Politicians from Nantes
Mayors of places in Pays de la Loire
Union for French Democracy politicians
Deputies of the 10th National Assembly of the French Fifth Republic